Kalicheh (also Romanized as Kalīcheh; also known as Kalījeh, Kalijeh, Kalījer, and Kalūcheh) is a village in Chenarud-e Jonubi Rural District, Chenarud District, Chadegan County, Isfahan Province, Iran. At the 2006 census, its population was 226, in 57 families.

References 

Populated places in Chadegan County